The 2018 Harrow London Borough Council election took place on 3 May 2018 to elect members of Harrow London Borough Council in England. This was on the same day as other local elections in England. The Conservatives had hoped to win control of the council from Labour, but Labour emerged with an increased number of seats and kept their majority. The Liberal Democrats lost their only seat in the borough. The Conservatives lost seats to Labour, but maintained their total of 28 by winning two seats that had been held by independents.

Overall Results

Candidates

Belmont

Canons

Edgware

Greenhill

Harrow on the Hill

Harrow Weald

Hatch End

Headstone North

Headstone South

Kenton East

Kenton West

Marlborough

Pinner

Pinner South

Queensbury

Rayners Lane

Roxbourne

Roxeth

Stanmore Park

Wealdstone

West Harrow

By-elections

Pinner South

References

2018 London Borough council elections
2018